Alicia J. Rose is a photographer, filmmaker and musician based in Portland, Oregon. Her photography has been featured in Rolling Stone, XLR8R, V, Elle, Spin, Sunset, Filter, Fader, Portland Monthly, NY Times, Wall Street Journal, Sunset and many others. A photograph she took of chef Naomi Pomeroy, of the Portland restaurant Beast, holding a dead pig, received significant attention and was honored with a 2008 PDN Photo Annual Award and a multiple page spread in Elle Magazine. Rose has directed music videos for Cake, Corin Tucker, Bob Mould, Menomena, Laura Gibson and others. She completed her narrative short film debut The Gift of Gravity in 2014, and created the comedic web series The Benefits of Gusbandry. She is currently in pre-production on her first feature film project - the music/narrative/hybrid "A Kaddish For Bernie Madoff" in collaboration with poet/musician Alicia Jo Rabins.

Rose is also a musician, known in her recording career as Miss Murgatroid, an accordionist, singer and drummer. She has released five full-length albums, three credited solely to Miss Murgatroid and two collaborations with vocalist and violinist Petra Haden entitled Bella Neurox and Hearts & Daggers. She currently plays accordion, synth and drums in Portland band Party Witch with drummer Shawna Gore.

Filmography

Films 
 "A Kaddish for Bernie Madoff: The Film" (2021) feature film
 "The Benefits of Gusbandry" (2015–present) web series
 "The Gift of Gravity" (2014) short film

Music videos 
 "Blue Lead Fences" Loch Lomond (2008)
 "The Sound" Miles Benjamin Anthony Robinson (2009)
 "Golden and Green" The Builders and the Butchers (2009)
 "Octavio" Viva Voce (2009)
 "Bed-In Sessions" (multiple artists/Live videos) (2011)
 "TAOS" Menomena (2011)
 "Black Tongue" Mastodon (2011)
 "Bored of Memory" Holcombe Waller (2011)
 "City Sleep" Talkdemonic (2011)
 "Hey Hey Hey" Jack's Mannequin (2011)
 "Navy Parade" AgesandAges (2011)
 "Rhyme the Reason" Golden Bloom (2011)
 "La Grande" Laura Gibson (2012)
 "Mustache Man" Cake (2012)
 "Street Parade" Theresa Andersson (2012)
 "The Descent" Bob Mould (2013)
 "There's Only Love" Ewert and The Two Dragons (2013)
 "An Evening with Neil Gaiman & Amanda Palmer" (2013) 
 "Neskowin" Corin Tucker Band (2013)
 "I Don't Know You Anymore" Bob Mould (2014)
 "Do the Right Thing" AgesandAges (2014)
 "Walk Unafraid" from the movie Wild by First Aid Kit (2014)
 "Start Over" MC Frontalot (2015)
 "Dani" Briana Marela (2015)
 "All Across This Land" Blitzen Trapper (2015)
 "Voices in My Head" Bob Mould (2016)
 "Hold On" Bob Mould (2016)
 "They Want More" Ages and Ages (2016)
 "As It Is" Ages and Ages (2016)
 "Cruel Companion" Baskery (2017)
 "Maybe a Moment" Justin Townes Earle (2017)
 "Meiyo" Symbion Project (2017)
 "Down and Out" EMA (2017)
 "Girls Sit Screaming" Ivy Ross Ricci (2018)
 "Heart of Mine" Varros (2018)
 "Domestication" Laura Gibson (2018)
 "Sunshine Session" Bob Mould (2018)

Commercial/Brand Commissioned video 
 "Travel Connectivity" AT&T (2012)
 "Game Connectivity" AT&T (2012)
 "It Feels Like Home" Knowledge Universe (2013)
 "The Power of 3 in 1" Knowledge Universe (2013)
 "Sponsored Data" AT&T (2013)
 "Aviation Gin Cocktail" House Spirits (2013)
 "Flair Bartending" House Spirits (2013)
 "Making Westward Whiskey" House Spirits Distillery (2013)
 "P:ear Blossoms Fundraiser" (2014)
 "Crowdfunding Medical Research" Consano (2014)
 "Open Primaries" 30/15 Second Broadcast Spots for Ballot Measure 90 (2014)
 "Piano. Push. Play" for non-profit Piano.Push.Play. (2015)
 "The Underdog is Present" for non-profit Underdog Railroad Rescue (2016)
 "Burger Drunk" for Killer Burger (2017)
 "Dirty Carnivore Moment" for Killer Burger (2017)
 "We Commit" "Meathead" & "Wake & Bake" commercial campaign for Killer Burger (2017)
 "Young Audiences presents "Bright Moments" with The Camas High School Choir" (2018)
 "NEA Heritage Fellow Profile" Feryal Abbasi-Ghnaim (2018)
 "Where Everybody Knows Your Game" Lucky Eagle Casino Commercial & Billboard Campaign (2018)
 "My Card Is Better Than Your Card/Marge & Florence" Lucky Eagle Casino Commercial & Billboard Campaign (2019)
 "Activating Tigard Universal Plaza" Campaign for City of Tigard (2020)
 "It's Not A Competition" Lucky Eagle Casino Commercial Campaign (2021)

Discography

Albums 
 Methyl Ethyl Key Tones (1993)
 Myoclyonic Melodies (1996)
 Through Alien Empires (1997)
 Bella Neurox (credited as Miss Murgatroid & Petra Haden) (1999)
 Hearts & Daggers (credited as Miss Murgatroid & Petra Haden) (2008)
 Riot Rage Rejoice Moon Tiger (accordion/vocals) (2018)
 Ruler Party Witch (2020)

References

External links 
 

Photographers from Oregon
Living people
American accordionists
Women accordionists
Year of birth missing (living people)
21st-century accordionists
21st-century American women musicians
21st-century American women photographers
21st-century American photographers